Konderan (also Romanized as Konderān and Kondorān; also known as Kandārun, Kandūrān, Kondārūn, and Kondūrān) is a village in Moghuyeh Rural District, in the Central District of Bandar Lengeh County, Hormozgan Province, Iran. At the 2006 census, its population was 404, in 76 families.

References 

Populated places in Bandar Lengeh County